Haystack Mountain is an  mountain summit located in Sublette County of  Wyoming, United States.

Geography 
The mile-long peak is situated in the remote Wind River Range, one mile west of the Continental Divide, and approximately four miles southeast of the Cirque of the Towers. It is set in the Bridger Wilderness, on land managed by Bridger-Teton National Forest. Neighbors include Schiestler Peak, 1.9 mile to the west, Big Sandy Mountain 1.5 mile north, and East Temple Peak 1.6 mile south. Access is via a half-day hike on the Big Sandy Trail. Precipitation runoff from the mountain drains into headwaters of the Big Sandy River, which is a tributary of the Green River.

Climate 
According to the Köppen climate classification system, Haystack Mountain is located in an alpine subarctic climate zone with long, cold, snowy winters, and cool to warm summers. Due to its altitude, it receives precipitation all year, as snow in winter, and as thunderstorms in summer.

Climbing 

A partial list of the 17 established climbing routes on Haystack's popular granite walls:

 North Gully –
 North Face – (II 5.6) – 1958 – Jack Curtin and John Wells
 Minor Dihedral – (III 5.9) – 1964 – Pete Croff, Phil Fowler, Richard Schori
 Major Dihedral – (IV 5.9+) – 1964 – Fred Beckey, Jerry Fuller
 Flashflood – (II 5.9) – 1969 – Harvey Carter, James Ebert
 Railroad Tracks – (III 5.8) – 1973 – Joe Kelsey, Bill St. Jean
 Central Corner – (III 5.9) – 1973 – Elaine Mathews, Stuart Phillips
 Southern Wall Left – (IV 5.10c) – 1974 – Joe Kelsey, Dave Loeks, Dick Williams
 Seams Thin – (IV 5.10d) – 1995 – Tim Wolfe, Chris Abbott
 Pika Alliteration – (II 5.8) – 2010 – Jared Spaulding, Jake Koplen, Jackson Smith

Hazards

Encountering bears is a concern in the Wind River Range. There are other concerns as well, including bugs, wildfires, adverse snow conditions and nighttime cold temperatures.

Importantly, there have been notable incidents, including accidental deaths, due to falls from steep cliffs (a misstep could be fatal in this class 4/5 terrain) and due to falling rocks, over the years, including 1993, 2007 (involving an experienced NOLS leader), 2015 and 2018.  A 54-year-old climber from Durango fell 400–800 feet to his death from nearby Steeple Peak in 2017. Other incidents include a seriously injured backpacker being airlifted near Squaretop Mountain in 2005, and a fatal hiker incident (from an apparent accidental fall) in 2006 that involved state search and rescue. The U.S. Forest Service does not offer updated aggregated records on the official number of fatalities in the Wind River Range.

See also
 List of mountain peaks of Wyoming

References

External links 
 Haystack Mountain rock climbing: Mountainproject.com
 Weather forecast: National Weather Service

Bridger–Teton National Forest
Mountains of Sublette County, Wyoming
Mountains of Wyoming
North American 3000 m summits